Mehlella, also Amata Saww ('Grouping Day') or Sigd ('Prostration', also romanized Sig'd), is one of the unique holidays of the Beta Israel (Ethiopian Jewish) community, and is celebrated on the 29th of the Hebrew month of Marcheshvan. Since 2008, it has been an official Israeli state holiday.

Date
Previously, Sigd was celebrated on the 29th of Kislev, and after a calendar reform in the mid-19th century it was moved to its present day, 50 days after Yom Kippur.

Etymology
The word Sigd itself is Ge'ez for "prostration" and is related to  sgēd "to prostrate oneself (in worship)". The Semitic root √sgd is the same as in mesgid, one of the two Beta Israel Ge'ez terms for "synagogue" (etymologically related to  masjid "mosque", literally "place of prostration"),  and from the same Semitic root we also have the Hebrew verb לסגוד lisgod, "to worship".

Significance
There are two oral traditions about the origin of Sigd. One tradition traces it to the 6th century, in the time of King Gebre Mesqel of Axum, son of King Kaleb, when the war between Jews and Christians ended and both communities separated from each other. The second tradition traces it to the 15th century as a result of persecution by Christian emperors. The first mention of Sigd is from the 15th century.

Sigd symbolizes the acceptance of the Torah. The kahənat have also maintained a tradition of the holiday arising as a result of persecution by Christian kings, during which the kahənat retreated into the wilderness to appeal to God for His mercy. Additionally they sought to unify the Beta Israel and prevent them from abandoning the Haymanot (laws and traditions) under persecution. So they looked toward the Book of Nehemiah and were inspired by Ezra's presenting the "book of the law of Moses" before the assembly of Israel after it had been lost to them during the Babylonian exile.

Event
Traditionally in commemoration of the appeals made by the Kessim and consequent mass gathering, the Beta Israel would make pilgrimages to Midraro, Hoharoa, or Wusta Tsegai (possibly marking locations of relief from Christian persecution) every year to reaffirm themselves as a religious community. Ascending up the mountain ritually commemorates the giving of the Torah at Mt. Sinai. 

Today, during the celebration, members of the community fast, recite Psalms, and gather in Jerusalem where Kessim read from the Orit (the Octateuch). The ritual is followed by the breaking of the fast, dancing, and general revelry.

Official national holiday in Israel
In February 2008 MK Uri Ariel submitted legislation to the Knesset in order to establish Sigd as an Israeli national holiday, and in July 2008 the Knesset "decided to officially add the Ethiopian Sigd holiday to the list of State holidays." According to an opinion piece in the Jerusalem Post newspaper, however, "While the qessotch [Kessim] and Beta Israel rabbis are pleased that the Sigd became an official Israeli state holiday in 2008, they would also like the holiday to become an integral part of the yearly Jewish holiday cycle and be embraced by more Jews, at least in Israel, rather than remain a holiday primarily celebrated by the Jewish community from Ethiopia."

Israeli President Isaac Herzog celebrated Sigd with the Ethiopian Jewish community in on the Armon Hanatziv Promenade in November 2021. In his speech, he hailed Sigd as “a holiday of victory” and praised the Ethiopian Jewish community for its proactive efforts to immigrate to Israel.

References

Further reading 
Jon G. Abbink, "Segd Celebration in Ethiopia and Israel: Continuity and Change of a Falasha Religious Holiday", Anthropos, Vol. 78, 1983, pp. 789–810.
Shai Afsai, "Past in the Present: An inside look at Sigd — the holiday of Ethiopian Jewry — and the struggle to secure its survival," Ami Magazine, December 5, 2012, pp. 78–85; "The Sigd: From Ethiopia to Israel," CCAR Journal: The Reform Jewish Quarterly, Fall 2014.
Shoshana Ben-Dor, "The Sigd of Beta Israel: Testimony To A Community In Transition" in Michael Ashkenazi and Alex Weingrod (Editors), Ethiopian Jews and Israel, Transaction Publishers, 1987, pp. 140-159.
Kay Kaufman Shelemay, "Seged, a Falasha Pilgrimage Festival", Musica Judaica, Vol. lII, 1, pp. 42–62.
Kay Kaufman Shelemay, Music, Ritual, and Falasha History, Michigan State University Press, 1986, .
Wolf Leslau, Falasha Anthology, Yale University Press, 1951.
James Arthur Quirin, The Evolution of the Ethiopian Jews: A History of the Beta Israel (Falasha) to 1920, University of Pennsylvania Press, 1992, .

External links
"The Jewish Agency for Israel page", a brief description of the holiday from the Department of Zionist Education
Shai Afsai, "The Sigd Festival comes home to Jerusalem", Jerusalem Post, December 12, 2012
"Photos of Sigd", by Danny Yanai

Beta Israel
Ethiopian Jews
Cheshvan observances
Haymanot
Kislev observances
Minor Jewish holidays
Public holidays in Israel